Bröckel (pronounced with a long  ö) is a municipality in the district of Celle, in Lower Saxony, Germany. It belongs to the collective municipality of Flotwedel with its seat in Wienhausen.

Geography 
Bröckel lies southeast of Celle. The River Fuhse, which separates Bröckel from the neighbouring parish of Uetze flows past about two kilometers south of the village.

Parish divisions 
The parish contains the hamlets of Katzhorn and Weghaus.

History 
The first recorded mention of the parish was in 1215. The name of the village is derived from Brockelhe (Brauck = Bruch i.e. moor or marsh).

Politics

Council 
The parish council of Bröckel comprises 11 members, including the chair (Bürgermeister):
 CDU − 8 seats
 SPD − 2 seats
(as at: local elections of 10 September 2006)

Bürgermeister 
The voluntary Bürgermeister Heinrich Behrens was elected on 9 September 2001.

Coat of arms 
Emblazonment: "in gold a broad blue stripe, on which is a silver horse collar decorated with gold, to the right a green ear of reed, left by a green ear of corn."

Economy and infrastructure 
In Bröckel is the indoor park of Viva Arena.

Transport 
Bröckel lies on the B 214 federal road which runs around the village on a bypass.

Sources 
 Friedrich Barenscheer: Chronik des Frachtfahrerdorfes Bröckel, 1963, Selbstverlag der Gemeinde Bröckel, Schriftenreihe des Lönsbund Celle Band 3, 169 Seiten

References

External links 
 Website of the collective municipality of Flotwedel

Celle (district)